Dudleston is a surname. Notable people with the surname include:

Barry Dudleston (born 1945), English cricketer and umpire
Bill Dudleston, American audio engineer